The Geißlstein, at 906 metres, is one of the smaller mountains in the Bavarian Forest. It lies east of the Brotjacklriegel and next to the Aschenstein. Its summit has no views. It may only be reached through trackless terrain.

Mountains under 1000 metres
Mountains of Bavaria
Mountains of the Bavarian Forest
Regen (district)